Phorcynis is an extinct genus of cartilaginous fish. The scales of Phorcynis have elongated crowns with a narrow median keel and short lateral folds and the teeth are asymmetrical, similar to those of Orectolobus.

References

Orectolobiformes
Fossils of Spain